Okean Elzy (translation: Elza's Ocean) is a Ukrainian rock band. It was formed in 1994 in Lviv, Ukraine. The band's vocalist and frontman is Svyatoslav Vakarchuk. In April 2007 Okean Elzy received FUZZ Magazine music awards for "Best rock act".

History

1994–1999 
The band Okean Elzy was founded in 1994 by four young men from Lviv; who were former members of the band Klan Tyshi (translation: Clan of Silence) which was founded in 1991. The original line-up featured a lead vocal, lead guitar, bass guitar and drums. Throughout 1994 the band spent their time rehearsing.

Their first concert took place in front of the Lviv Opera Theatre on 14 January 1995. Shortly after that appearance they released a demo tape called 'DEMO 94-95'. In 1995 they also participated for the first time in the two biggest (at the time) Ukrainian music festivals - Chervona Ruta and Melodiya, also participated in Is, a personal project of Lviv musician Oleg Sook, performed the song Long time ago.

In 1996 the band establish themselves on the festival circuit in Ukraine and beyond. Okean Elzy participated at Sribna Pidkova Festival, Alternative 2, Perlyny Sezonu, Tavriyski Ihry, Trust Open Air Gernsbach (Germany), Trash 96, and R.F.I. 96 (France).

In 1996 Okean Elzy also held their first concert outside Lviv. Their first appearance in the capital Kyiv took place in 1996 where they supported Deep Purple. In November–December of that year they recorded and released the group's first maxi-single  ("House of glass"). Shortly afterwards the first movie about the group was made by the TV channel TET and was broadcast nationally.

1997 saw tours in the south of France and in the west of Germany. Back to Ukraine they held a concert in their hometown of Lviv, drawing massive crowds.

The band's big break came in 1998, when they made the decision to move to Kyiv. There they started working on their first album Tam, de nas nema ("There, where we are not"). The group's first music video was recorded for the song "". This video was the first piece of modern Ukrainian music to make its mark on MTV Russia, as well as France's MCM Channel.

At the very beginning of 1999, Okean Elzy started working on their second album  ("I was in the sky"). In May the group decided to try to expand their fan base into Russia. Their first concert was at the festival Maxidrom. There were thousands of people there who already knew their songs, with many singing along.

On 16 September they played a solo concert at the MCM Cafe in Paris.

2000–2004 

In 2000, exactly one year after they started working on the album,  was released.

On 5 February Okean Elzy held a solo concert at the legendary Astoria Club (London). In March the keyboard player joined the band.

In 2001 Okean Elzy became the new face of Pepsi Cola in Ukraine as the new millennium dawned. They released their third album Model. The band launched a big tour around Ukraine called "Ask For More". In August they started working on their fourth album—Supersymetriya ("Supersymmetry"). The album was eventually released in 2003 and immediately the group embarked on their biggest tour ever.

At the end of 2003 Svyatoslav Vakarchuk, as the frontman of the band, became an official Ambassador of Ukrainian Culture.

In 2004 Denys Dudko (Ukrainian jazz bass player) and Miloš Jelić (composer from Novi Sad, Serbia) joined the band.

During the Orange Revolution, Okean Elzy actively supported the democratic changes which the population were demanding, with Slava emerging as a figurehead of the revolution.

2005–present 
In 2005 Petro Cherniavsky  joined the band.

On September 22, 2005, Okean Elzy released their new album GLORIA. After that the band went on tour (30 cities in Ukraine and 10 in Russia) with an audio crew consisting of Sergey Kamenev, Alexandr Kostin, Yurii Barybin and Vyacheslav Lavrinenko.

In September 2005, Vakarchuk became the UN's Ambassador of Good Will. Also, in September Okean Elzy started a joint campaign with IOM and MTV Europe Foundation, fighting human trafficking. Svyatoslav Vakarchuk, as UN's Ambassador of Goodwill for 2006, held meetings with students at Ukrainian and Poland universities. Vakarchuk is involved in a campaign to support reading. The project's aim is to draw the attention of young people to books and help fight illiteracy.

In November 2006, Okean Elzy visited Kosovo, where musicians had a concert for peacemakers from Ukraine, Poland, Germany, United States and other countries, which included an international contingent of peacemakers.

During the Football World Cup 2006 in Germany, Okean Elzy actively supported the Ukrainian national team and cheered the fans with their songs. The last song of the band called ... ("Oh, brother, merry times came...") made a huge splash in Ukraine. The song and the video were released as a single and all profits were donated to the child care center treating AIDS. Charity activities play a major role in OE's life.

In April 2006 OE went on tour, which includes Chicago, New York City and Toronto, where thousands sang along to their songs.

On April 25, 2007, Okean Elzy released a new album,  ("Measure"). After that the band went on a huge nationwide tour. During the month they held concerts in 27 Ukrainian cities. All of the concerts were held in large cities, mostly at stadiums and sporting arenas. The concerts were attended by more than 120,000 fans, which set a record for the group. For the two Kiev concerts, the attendance was about 24,000 total. In the history of Ukraine only Okean Elzy "for the second time" (after the GLORIA tour) gathered so many people in one place in such a short time.

In 2010 Okean Elzy went on their Dolce Vita Tour, in support of their latest album Dolce Vita, which included over one hundred concerts in Russia, Ukraine, Belarus, Europe and North America.

In December 2013 the band performed during the Euromaidan protests.

In 2013, Okean Elzy announced on their website a new album and new tour through Ukraine.

On June 21, 2014, for their 20th anniversary, Okean Elzy performed in front of 70,000 fans in Kyiv at NSC Olimpiyskiy. This concert was the largest in Ukrainian history.

Since the 2014 Russian annexation of Crimea the band stopped performing in Russia, being one of the few Ukrainian bands to do so.

In 2016, the most famous Ukrainian rock band Okean Elzy hits the road for a 2- year-long World tour to support its ninth studio album 'Without limits'.

On 24 August 2018 the band gathered around 100,000 fans at its concert at NSC Olimpiyskiy dedicated to Ukraine's independence day.

On 7 March 2022, during the 2022 Russian invasion of Ukraine, Okean Elzy's lead singer Vakarchuk joined the territorial defense battalion of Lviv Oblast.

Interesting Facts 

 According to Sviatoslav Vakarchuk, Okean Elzy will never take part in competitions, ie in events where participants compete for places (for example, "Eurovision"). This principle was adopted by the band at the very beginning, after the disappointment in the music competition "Pearls of the Seasons", where "OE" was in the lead from the beginning until the performance of the last band to win, and "Ocean" took only second place.
 One of the band's first PR managers mentions that in the early days they relied on an audience of 35+ women, as well as children from patriotic families.
 The themes of the band's songs are heard in the first Ukrainian animated cartoon series "Nikita's Fox" and in the children's film "Funny Tale".
 With the song "Children's Land" (together with Alyona Alyona for Children's Day) the band joined the action "This is how memory works", dedicated to the memory of Danylo Didik and all those who gave their lives for the independence of Ukraine.
 Coldplay performed Obijmy with Sviatoslav Vakarchuk during their Music of the Spheres Tour.

Band members

Current members 
 Svyatoslav Vakarchuk—lead vocals (1994–present)
 Denys Hlinin—drums, percussion (1994–present)
 Denys Dudko—bass, acoustic guitar, backing vocals (2004–present)
 Miloš Jelić—piano, synthesizers, backing vocals (2004–present)
 Vladimir Opsenica—guitars, backing vocals (unofficial 2013–2014; 2014–present)

Former members 
 Yuri Khustochka—bass guitar, backing vocals (1994–2004; one-off shows in 2013 and 2014)
 Dmytro Shurov—piano, synthesizers, backing vocals (unofficial 2000–2001; 2001–2004; one-off shows in 2013 and 2014)
 Pavlo Hudimov—guitars, mandolin, backing vocals (1994–2005; one-off shows in 2013 and 2014)
 Petro Chernyavsky—guitars, backing vocals (2005–2013)

Discography

Studio albums 
 Tam, de nas nema (Там, де нас нема - There, Where We Aren't) (1998)
  ( - I Was In Heaven) (2000)
 Model (2001)
 Supersymetriya ( - Supersymmetry) (2003)
 Gloria (2005)
  ( - Measure) (2007)
 Dolce Vita (2010)
  ( - The Land) (2013)
  ( - The Best) (2014)
  ( - Without Limits) (2016)

Acoustic albums 
 2003 -  (Your format)

Singles 
 1996 - "" (House of glass)
 2002 - "" (It is cold)
 2004 - "!" (Thank You!)
 2006 - "..." (Oh, brother, merry times came...)
 2009 – "..." (I want so much to...)
 2013 – "" (Embrace)
 2015 - "" (Not your war)
 2015 - "" (Life begins again)
 2015 - "'" (Moment)
 2016 - "" (Don't go)
 2017 - " (Radio edition)" (Sun (Radio edition))
 2018 - "" (Without you)
 2018 - ""
 2018 - "" (How many of us)
 2019 - "" (Boat)
 2019 - "" (Pass; for the soundtrack of The Rising Hawk)
 2020 - "" (When we will become ourselves)
 2020 - " (Remix)" (Embrace (Remix))
 2020 - "" (Hold on)
 2021 - "#" (Without you there is no me)
 2022 - "" (spring)
 2022 - "" (City of Mary)
 2022 - "" (Flowers of minefields)

Compilations 
 2006 - 1221 ("Best of" collection)
 2007 - ... (Selected...)
 2010 - The Best Of

Solo projects of Svyatoslav Vakarchuk 
 2008 -  (At night)
 2011 -  (Brussels)
 2021 -  (Greenhouse)

Multimedia

References

External links
 Official Okean Elzy website

Musical groups established in 1994
Ukrainian rock music groups